{{Infobox military conflict
| conflict          = Assault on Cádiz (1797)
| partof            = the French Revolutionary Wars
| image             = Nelson's Blockading Squadron at Cadiz 1797.jpg
| image_size        = 300
| caption           = Nelson's Blockading Squadron at Cádiz 1797 by T. Buttersworth, oil on canvas.
| date              = June 1797
| place             = Coast of Cádiz, Spain
| result            = Spanish victory
British assault repelled
Failure of the bombardment of the city
Economic losses for both countries
| combatant1        = 
| combatant2        =  Spain
| commander1        =  Horatio Nelson   John Jervis
| commander2        =  José de Mazarredo   Federico Gravina
| strength1         = 
| strength2         = 
| casualties1       = 3 armed boats sunkVictorys launch drivenashore
| casualties2       = 3 armed boats captured
}}

The Assault on Cádiz''' was a part of a protracted naval blockade of the Spanish port of Cádiz by the Royal Navy, which comprised the siege and the shelling of the city as well as an amphibious assault on the port itself from June to July 1797. After the battle of Cape Saint Vincent the British fleet led by Lord Jervis and Sir Horatio Nelson had appeared in the Gulf of Cádiz. In the first days of June the city was bombarded, causing slight damage to the Spanish batteries, navy and city. Nelson's objective was to force the Spanish admiral Jose Mazarredo to leave the harbour with the Spanish fleet. The Spanish response was to build gunboats and small ships to protect the entrance of the harbour from the British. By early July, after a series of failed attacks led by Rear Admiral Nelson, and with the British ships taking huge fire from the Spanish forts and batteries, the British withdrew and the siege was lifted. The naval blockade, however, lasted until 1802.

Background
In February 1797, the British routed a Spanish fleet near Cape St. Vincent but failed to strike a solid blow against the Spanish Navy in the uneven struggle. Admiral Sir John Jervis sailed for Lisbon after the engagement, frustrated at the escape of several valuable prizes including . New orders from the Admiralty demanded him to blockade and subdue the Spanish port of Cádiz, where much of the battered Spanish fleet had sought shelter. The First Sea Lord had ordered the assault as he believed that Jervis' victory over José de Córdoba y Ramos guaranteed a successful attack on that strategic harbour.

Blockade begins
The blockade of Cádiz, which had been begun by Jervis in 1797, had no intermission from that time until the peace of Amiens, and on the renewal of the war it was recommenced with all its former rigour. Two frigates were at the mouth of the harbour, for the purpose of intercepting any supply of provisions for the enemy. Nelson said he knew no more certain means of bringing them out than starvation.

By keeping at this distance from Cádiz, Nelson prevented the enemy from acquiring any accurate knowledge of his force.

Battle

Nelson was appointed to the command of the inshore squadron blockading Cádiz. An order from Sir John Jervis directed the launches and barges of two divisions of the fleet to assemble on board , between 9 and 10 o'clock every night, armed with carronades, spikes, cutlasses, broad axes, and chopping knives, a lamp in each boat with spikes, a sledge-hammer, and a coil of small rope, to tow off any armed brig, mortar or gun-boat, that should be carrier,  and to follow the directions of Nelson for the night.

The Spaniards had equipped a number of gun-boats and large launches, in which they rowed guard during the night, to prevent the near approach of the blockaders. On these a vigorous attack was made in the night of 3 July by the British boats, headed by Nelson himself, which pursued the Spaniards close to the walls of Cádiz, and took two mortar-boats and an armed launch. In this conflict it was the admiral's fortune to encounter the barge of Don Miguel Tregoyen, the commander of the Spanish gun-boats. The struggle that ensued was one of the most perilous in which Nelson had ever been engaged. He fought hand to hand with the Spanish commandant, and it was his own opinion that he must have lost his life but for the devoted attachment of his faithful coxswain, John Sykes.

The Spanish garrison of Cádiz at this time consisted of more than 4,000 men. On the line wall facing the bay were mounted 70 pieces of cannon and eight mortars; near the Alameda were four other mortars; and from the Capuchins, at the back of the city, to the land point were three batteries of four guns each. Such was the strength of the place when Nelson was ordered to bombard it. The first attempt proved ineffective, as the large mortar had been materially damaged in earlier service. The second produced considerable effect in the town and among the shipping, as ten sail of the line, among them the ships carrying the flags of admirals Mazarredo and Gravina, warped out of the range of the shells with much precipitation on the following morning.

On the night of 8 July, Nelson meditated another operation under his own immediate direction; but the wind blew so strong down the bay, that it was found impossible to bring up the bomb vessels to the point of attack in time. On the following day, he informed Earl St. Vincent that, though he hoped enough had been done to force out the Spanish fleet, yet in case there had not, he would try them again.

The continuation of the blockade for most of the following three years, greatly curtailed the operations of the Spanish fleet from Cádiz until the Peace of Amiens in 1802, allowing the Royal Navy to establish its dominance in the Mediterranean.

Aftermath
Nelson had some time before he proposed to the commander-in-chief an expedition against the town of Santa Cruz, in the island of Tenerife. Lord Jervis allowed Sir Horatio to select such ships and officers as he thought proper for this service. The expedition resulted in another defeat for him.

The Spanish citizens of Cádiz composed a song of the victory that became very popular in Spain during the 19th century:¿De qué sirve a los inglesestener fragatas ligerassi saben que Mazarredotiene lanchas cañoneras?What good is for Englishhaving light frigatesif they know that Mazarredohas gunboats?References

Bibliography

Fernández Duro, Cesáreo (1902). Armada española desde la unión de los reinos de Castilla y de León, Vol. VI. Sucesores de Rivadeneyra, Madrid. (in Spanish)

Pelham Brenton, Edward (1837).  The naval History of Great Britain, from the Year MDCCLXXXIII to MDCCCXXXVI Vol II.'' London.

Cádiz
1797 in Spain
Cádiz
Cádiz
Cádiz
Blockades
History of Cádiz